The John A. Finch Caretaker's House is a historic house in Hayden Lake, Idaho. It was built in 1903 for John A. Finch, a significant investor in Coeur d'Alene's mines. It was designed in the Swiss Chalet style by architect Kirtland Cutter. It has been listed on the National Register of Historic Places since September 14, 1987.

References

National Register of Historic Places in Kootenai County, Idaho
Houses completed in 1903
Swiss chalet architecture